The 6th Lux Style Awards ceremony was held in Malaysia. The show was hosted by Sana Nawaz, Shoaib Mansoor and from the members of Banana News Network.

Film

Television

Music

Special 
Chairperson's Lifetime Achievement Award
Naheed Akhtar

References

Lux Style Awards
Lux Style Awards
Lux Style Awards
Lux Style Awards
Lux
Lux